are Belgian citizens of Japanese ancestry.

History
The Japanese started to arrive in considerable numbers in Brussels in the 1950s. At this time the Belgian-Japanese economic partnerships had started. By 1992, the Brussels Japanese community was already one of the largest in Europe.

In Hasselt there is a Japanese garden, donated to the Flemish city by the city of Itami, Japan. It is the largest Japanese garden in Western Europe, extending for 2.5 hectares. There are other Japanese gardens in Belgium, such as the one in the city of Ostend. There is a good relationship between the city of Ostend and the Japanese company Daikin, located in the industrial area of Ostend, and whose company buildings can be seen along the Ostend-Brussels highway. In Laeken, Brussels, there is a Japanese tower, built between 1900 and 1904 by order of King Leopold II. Also in Brussels there is a Japanese international school, the Japanese School of Brussels, founded in 1979 over a Japanese Saturday school opened in 1974. In Auderghem, near the Japanese School, there is a street named  ("Nipponic Avenue"—Nippon means "Japan" in Japanese), opened and named thus in 1986, due to its proximity to the school. Belgium international footballer Radja Nainggolan was nicknamed "the Ninja" by Italian mass media, due to his footballing abilities, "determination to fight on every loose ball", and oriental facial features. The genesis of the nickname dates from his time at Cagliari. Partly of Asian origin, Nainggolan actually has no Japanese ancestry, but is of Flemish-Indonesian descent. There are Japanese magazines published for Japanese Belgians.

Demographics
As of 2021 there were about 6,000 Japanese living in Belgium. In 2016 there were 2,754 Japanese in Brussels alone. In 2016, most (71%) of the Brussels Japanese lived in the southeast
of the Brussels Region, more precisely in Woluwe-Saint-Lambert, Woluwe-Saint-Pierre, Auderghem and Watermael-Boitsfort. 62% of the Japanese community in Belgium lives in Brussels.

The Japanese community of Belgium was by 1992 one of the largest in Europe. The number of Japanese in Belgium is currently stagnating compared to the rising numbers of other Asian nationalities such as the Chinese and Indians.

Notable people

Yukio Goto (died 1976), footballer
Shigeomi Hasumi (1967–2017), composer, arranger and musician
Kento Marc Ishida (1995), baseball player
Junya Ito (1993), footballer
Eiji Kawashima (1983), footballer
Yumi Lambert (1995), model
Alexis Minatoya (1988), basketball player
Ryu Shichinohe (1988), judoka
SoulJa (1983), hip-hop musician and songwriter
Violette Wautier (1993), singer-songwriter and actress

See also
Japanese community of Brussels
The Japanese School of Brussels

References

Belgium
Belgium
 
Ethnic groups in Belgium
Belgium–Japan relations